Leiothlypis is a genus of New World warbler, formerly classified within the genus Oreothlypis or Vermivora.

The genus was introduced by the Dutch ornithologist George Sangster in 2008 with the Tennessee warbler (Leiothlypis peregrina) as the type species. The genus name is derived from the Ancient Greek λειος/leios meaning "plain" and θλυπις/thlupis, an unknown small bird mentioned by Aristotle.

Although in 2009 the genus was rejected by the American Ornithological Society's Committee on Classification and Nomenclature of North and Middle American Birds, it was accepted in their 2019 supplement to the Check-list of North American Birds.

Species
Six species are recognised:

References

 
Bird genera
Parulidae